is a Japanese footballer currently playing as a midfielder for YSCC Yokohama.

Club career
Having started his career at FC Yanaka and Kawagoe Mizuuekoen, Nakamura returned to Yanaka, now known as FC Gois, before a move to Portugal to join Espinho, and later Braga. On his return to Japan, he signed for J3 League side YSCC Yokohama.

Career statistics

Club
.

Notes

References

2000 births
Living people
Association football people from Saitama Prefecture
Japanese footballers
Association football midfielders
J3 League players
S.C. Espinho players
S.C. Braga players
YSCC Yokohama players
Japanese expatriate footballers
Japanese expatriate sportspeople in Portugal
Expatriate footballers in Portugal